Momken ("Possible") is a 1995 studio album by Mohamed Mounir.

Track listing

Personnel 

Accordion – Farouk Mohamed
Bass Guitar – Romany Krishna
Guitar – Tarek Hamouda, Amr Paulino, Mohamed Mabrouk
Duff – Salim Sha'rawy, Mohamed Laziz
Kavala – Ibrahim Fathy
Mixed By – Amr Mahmoud, Mohamed Sakr
Oud – Hussein Saber
Percussion – Ayman Sedky, Khaled Gomaa
Violin – Mounir Nasr El-din

External links 
 
 

1995 albums
Mohamed Mounir albums